Tsao Chun-yang (born 29 March 1976 in Tainan, Taiwan) is a retired Taiwanese baseball player.

He is the only person in CPBL history to have won Rookie of the Year award and Most Valuable Player award in the same year, in the 1999 season. He was waived by the Uni-President Lions in the middle of 2008 season, and his contract was picked up by the Elephants.

Career statistics

CPBL

NPB

See also
 Chinese Professional Baseball League
 Uni-President Lions

References

External links
 

1976 births
Living people
Taiwanese expatriate baseball players in Japan
Nippon Professional Baseball pitchers
Chunichi Dragons players
Uni-President Lions players
Uni-President 7-Eleven Lions players
Brother Elephants players
Baseball players from Tainan
Asian Games medalists in baseball
Baseball players at the 1998 Asian Games
Medalists at the 1998 Asian Games
Asian Games bronze medalists for Chinese Taipei